"(I'm a) Road Runner" is a hit song by Junior Walker & the Allstars, and was the title track of the successful 1966 album Road Runner. Written by the team of Holland–Dozier–Holland, it was released on the Tamla (Motown) label in 1966 and reached the top twenty in the U.S. and the UK.

Background
Walker plays the distinctive tenor saxophone solo, backed by Mike Terry on baritone saxophone with Willie Woods on guitar. During the recording, it was discovered that Walker could play the song in only two keys. So Walker sang in a key that he could not play, and after being recorded, the saxophone track was sped up to match.

The pictorial single sleeve used a running bird similar to the Road Runner cartoon character.

Personnel
 Junior Walker & the Allstars

Junior Walker – tenor saxophone solo, vocals
Willie Woods  – guitar
Victor Thomas – organ
James Graves – drums

Additional personnel
Johnny Dawson – tambourine 
The Funk Brothers – other instrumentation 
Johnny Griffith – piano 
James Jamerson – bass
Joe Messina – guitar
Norris Patterson – tenor saxophone
Mike Terry – baritone saxophone
Eddie Willis – guitar

Chart history

Later versions
 British-American rock group Fleetwood Mac recorded the song with Dave Walker on lead vocals for their 1973 album Penguin.
 The Jerry Garcia Band performed a version of the song in 1975, which was featured on The Jerry Garcia Collection, Vol. 2: Let It Rock.
 James Taylor performed his version, in September 1976, in episode 1, season 2 of Saturday Night Live. Taylor also included the song on his 2008 album Covers.
 Steve Gaines from Lynyrd Skynyrd performed the song with his own band, Crawdad, in the mid 1970s. A recording of them performing it was released on Gaines's 2001 live compilation CD, Okie Special.
 Peter Frampton included the song on his 1977 album I'm in You.
 Publishing rights organization BMI had songwriters Holland-Dozier-Holland credited with co-writing Steve Winwood's 1988 song "Roll with It" due to its resemblance to "(I'm a) Roadrunner".

References

External links 
 List of cover versions of "(I'm a) Road Runner" at SecondHandSongs.com

Motown singles
1966 singles
Songs written by Holland–Dozier–Holland
Junior Walker songs
1966 songs